Virgilio Zapatero Gómez (born 26 June 1946) is a Spanish politician who served as Minister of Relations with the Cortes and Government Secretariat from July 1986 to July 1993.

References

1946 births
Living people
Autonomous University of Madrid alumni
Government ministers of Spain
20th-century Spanish politicians